Michendorf station is a railway station in the municipality of Michendorf, located in the Potsdam-Mittelmark district of Brandenburg, Germany.

References

Railway stations in Brandenburg
Railway stations in Germany opened in 1879
1879 establishments in Prussia
Buildings and structures in Potsdam-Mittelmark